, often referred to simply as Re:Zero and also known as Re: Life in a different world from zero, is a Japanese light novel series written by Tappei Nagatsuki and illustrated by Shin'ichirō Ōtsuka. The story centers on Subaru Natsuki, a hikikomori who suddenly finds himself transported to another world on his way home from the convenience store. The series was initially serialized on the website Shōsetsuka ni Narō from 2012 onwards. Thirty-two light novels, as well as five side story volumes and eight short story collections have been published by Media Factory under their MF Bunko J imprint.

The series' first three arcs have been adapted into separate manga series. The first, by Daichi Matsue, was published between June 2014 and March 2015. The second, by Makoto Fugetsu, has been published by Square Enix since October 2014. Matsue launched the third adaptation, also published by Media Factory, in May 2015. Additionally, Media Factory has published two anthology manga with stories by different artists. An anime television series adaptation produced by White Fox aired from April to September 2016, starting with an hour-long special. The first of two OVA based on the series was released in October 2018, and the second OVA was released in November 2019. In March 2017, game developer 5pb. released a visual novel based on the series. A second season aired in a split-cour format, with the first half airing from July to September 2020, and the second half airing from January to March 2021.

The novels and all three manga adaptations are published in North America by Yen Press. The anime adaptation has been licensed by Crunchyroll outside Asia, which released the anime on home video through Funimation in the United States and Anime Limited in the United Kingdom. In Southeast Asia and South Asia, the series is licensed by Muse Communication.

The light novels have sold more than 11 million copies, while the anime series has sold more than 70,000 copies on home video. The light novels have been praised for their fresh take on the "another world" concept, but have been criticized for awkward dialogue and redundancy. The series has been praised by critics for its fleshed-out characters, complex world and lore, and thought-provoking topics and themes. The series received awards at the 2015–2016 Newtype Anime Awards and the 2017 Sugoi Japan Awards, and was nominated for Anime of the Year at the 1st Crunchyroll Anime Awards.

Plot

Subaru Natsuki is a NEET who is suddenly summoned to a fantasy-like world. Just after arriving, he is killed while trying to help a young half-elf he befriends, Emilia, who is a candidate to become the next ruler of the Kingdom of Lugunica, only to revive some hours in the past. After dying some times, Subaru realizes that he has the power to turn back time after his death. After successfully helping Emilia, Subaru starts living in one of the Mansions of the Roswaal Mathers as a butler. Out of gratitude and affection for Emilia, Subaru makes use of his newfound ability to protect her and help on her ambition to be successfully appointed as the next queen, also providing assistance to other friends he makes along the way, while suffering due to the pain inflicted on him every time he dies, and carrying along the memories of everything that happened before his power activates, which is forgotten by everybody except for him.

Production

Light novel
In the late 2000s, the light novel series The Familiar of Zero (Zero no Tsukaima) spawned a number of fan fiction on the website Shōsetsuka ni Narō ("Let's Become Novelists"), also known as Narō. Tappei Nagatsuki initially began writing The Familiar of Zero fan fiction on Narō, before building on its isekai ("other world") concept to write his own original web novel series on Narō, called Re:Zero, which began serialization in 2012.

The series' editor at MF Bunko J, Masahito Ikemoto, first became aware of the web novel in April 2013, when it began to appear on his Twitter feed. He was immediately impressed by the series' use of Return by Death, and how it was a "depressing, yet surprising, twist on the fantasy genre," and began working with Nagatsuki to adapt the series into a light novel. Most light novels are around 250 pages in length, but Nagatsuki submitted a manuscript of more than 1,000 pages for the first novel, forcing Ikemoto to edit it heavily. While Nagatsuki wanted to engage in worldbuilding early on, Ikemoto felt that it was more necessary to make the readers feel engaged with the characters. He ended up rearranging the story so that parts focusing on the world and its lore were pushed back to the third arc of the series.

Prior to his involvement in Re:Zero, illustrator Shin'ichirō Ōtsuka worked on video games, which led him to draw the backgrounds first when illustrating the series. After reading the web novel, he submitted a number of character designs for the major characters to Ikemoto. Subaru's initial design made him look like a delinquent, with Otsuka later describing it as "not the face of a boy in his teens," leading Ikemoto to request that the character be "more friendly and less fierce" so that the audience could empathize with him during emotional scenes. Originally, Emilia's character design appeared extremely plain, so a number of features were added to make her more interesting. Ikemoto specified that she must fit the "archetypal heroine" mold. Rem and Ram also underwent significant changes from the first draft: their original designs lacked the characteristic hair parts, and their maid uniforms were longer and more "traditional."

Anime

Development and production
The possibility of an anime adaptation came up early in the development of the series; Shō Tanaka, a producer at Kadokawa, asked Ikemoto about properties which might lend themselves to being animated, and Ikemoto recommended that Tanaka read Nagatsuki's web novels. Despite an initial miscommunication which led to Ikemoto believing that Tanaka wasn't interested, talks of adapting the series began soon after the web novels began the transition to print.

As part of talks for the potential anime adaptation, Ikemoto and Tanaka spoke to Tsunaki Yoshikawa, an animation producer at studio White Fox, about the possibility of his studio animating the series. Hoping to adapt the series into an anime similar to Steins;Gate (which White Fox also produced), and having a positive impression of the studio as one that did faithful adaptations, Tanaka then formally approached them about producing the show. White Fox's president contacted Yoshikawa for his opinion, and Yoshikawa recommended they accept, as long as the series "doesn't violate any broadcasting regulations."

Production on the anime began sometime after the release of the fifth novel in October 2014. Masaharu Watanabe was chosen by Yoshikawa to direct the series because he had previously worked for the studio doing key animation, while Kyūta Sakai was chosen to be the series' character designer and chief animation director because Yoshikawa felt that she would be able to do the novel's art justice whilst maintaining a consistent animation quality throughout the series' 25-episode run. Masahiro Yokotani was brought on board as the main writer, with the series being his first time composing for a "reborn in another world"-type story. Yoshikawa warned him about the violence in the series, but Yokotani was still surprised by the violent and disturbing scenes in novels three and beyond, having only read the first novel when he agreed to work on the project; he delegated the script writing of those episodes in the second cour to the other two scriptwriters. Yoshiko Nakamura joined the project sometime after Yokotani had completed the script for episode 3. When it proved unfeasible for Yokotani and Nakamura to write the scripts alone, the decision was made to bring another scriptwriter on board. Gaku Iwasa, the president of White Fox, asked them to hire someone "younger," leading Yokotani to suggest Eiji Umehara. Nagatsuki had recently been playing Chaos;Child, which Umehara had written for, and he approved the choice, suggesting that they let Umehara write the "painful parts"; Umehara was invited to join the project around the time that the scripts for episodes 8 and 9 were being written. Re:Zero was the first light novel adaptation that either of the screenwriters had worked on.

Original author Tappei Nagatsuki was very active in the production of the anime, attending script meetings and recording sessions. When the staff would encounter a problem with a scene, he would occasionally write lines for them to use as reference while writing the script. The series was not initially intended to have 25 episodes, but was extended to give more time to the battle with the White Whale (which was expanded from two to three episodes) and to the content of episode 18 (episodes 16 to 18 were originally supposed to be covered in two episodes). Watanabe's main directive to the staff was to "capture the mood of the novel as much as possible"; the scriptwriters had discussions about how to compress the dense source material without losing the central elements of the story, and Nakamura recalls working with composition notes that "went on for pages." While planning and scripting the anime, choosing a proper conclusion was one of the most difficult parts for the staff, and a significant amount of time was devoted to choosing what to cover in the final episode, which included material not yet covered in the light novel.

After joining the project, both Nakamura and Umehara had to adjust their views of the main character, and were forced to rewrite scenes where they had made Subaru appear "cool." At Watanabe's direction, Nakamura was made to rewrite Subaru's telling of The Red Ogre Who Cried in episode 6 multiple times. The staff also had difficulty deciding on a song to use for Subaru's ringtone that plays during the closing scene of episode 19, considering songs like "Kanpaku Sengen," "The Beard Song," and "M" by Princess Princess, before settling on "Yoake no Michi" from Dog of Flanders.

Soundtrack
While choosing a composer to produce the series' music, director Watanabe wanted to choose someone who had "hit a nerve" with him. A fan of drama series, Watanabe was struck by a piece of music in the medical drama Death's Organ, and found that the series' composer, Kenichiro Suehiro, had also worked on a number of his favorite anime and drama series. After Suehiro was attached to the production, Watanabe gave him three major guidelines: use human voices during the Return by Death sequences; compose the music like he would for a drama or a movie to capture the emotional scenes; and "pull all the stops" for the suspenseful scenes. Additionally, for the first cour, Watanabe asked for music with a "suspenseful" vibe, while requesting music with a "romantic" feel for the second cour. Both Watanabe and Suehiro are fans of Italian composer Ennio Morricone, and Suehiro tried to take inspiration from his works while composing the soundtrack. Watanabe also requested that there be songs that mimicked Hans Zimmer's score from The Dark Knight. While Suehiro used music that wasn't very "anime-ish" during most of the series, he was asked to use more traditional anime music during the slice of life scenes. A number of times during the series, such as in episodes 7 and 15, Watanabe made it a point to use an entire song, something which is unusual in most anime.

The series makes limited use of its opening and ending themes, and Watanabe has said that he wished he could use them more frequently.

Media

Web novel
The Re:Zero web novel was initially serialized by Tappei Nagatsuki (writing under the username ) on the user-generated content site Shōsetsuka ni Narō from April 20, 2012, onwards. As of February 13, 2021, six story arcs have been completed and two "EX" side stories have been published, with the seventh arc in progress. In total the webnovel has 609 chapters available.

Light novels

Following the web novel's publication, Media Factory acquired the series for print publication. The first light novel volume, with illustrations by Shin'ichirō Ōtsuka, was published on January 24, 2014, under their MF Bunko J imprint. As of December 2022, thirty-two volumes have been published, as well as five side story volumes and eight short story collections. Nagatsuki and Otsuka began publishing a series of short side-stories focusing on characters from the series in Monthly Comic Alive, starting with the character Elsa in August 2016. It was followed with one focused on Petra Leyte on November 26, 2016, and one featuring Ram and Rem on January 27, 2017. The light novels are published in English by Yen Press, who announced their acquisition of the license via Twitter on December 2, 2015. The publisher has also acquired the license to the Re:Zero EX side novels.

Manga

A manga adaptation by Daichi Matsue, titled , began serialization in the August 2014 issue of Media Factory's seinen manga magazine Monthly Comic Alive on June 27, 2014. The final volume was released on March 23, 2015. On December 2, 2015, Yen Press announced that they had licensed the series.

A second manga, titled , with art by Makoto Fugetsu, began serialization in Square Enix's seinen magazine Monthly Big Gangan on October 25, 2014. The final chapter was published on December 24, 2016, and an extra chapter was published on January 25, 2017. The second adaptation has also been licensed by Yen Press.

Daichi Matsue began serializing a third manga,  in Comic Alive July 2015 issue on May 27, 2015. Yen will publish the third adaptation as well.

A manga anthology, titled , was published by Media Factory on June 23, 2016. A second anthology was published on September 23, 2017.

Internet radio show
An Internet radio show to promote the series named  began broadcasting on March 27, 2016. The show was aired every Monday and was hosted by Rie Takahashi, the voice actress for Emilia. Guests that appeared on the show included Yūsuke Kobayashi (Subaru Natsuki), Inori Minase (Rem), Yumi Uchiyama (Puck), Rie Murakawa (Ram), Satomi Arai (Beatrice), Chinatsu Akasaki (Felt), Kana Ueda (Anastasia Hoshin), and Yui Horie (Felix). The show ran for 33 episodes and concluded on December 19, 2016. The first radio CD, which contains episodes 1–8 of the show, was released on June 27, 2016. The second, which contains episodes 9–16 of the show, was released on September 28, 2016. The third, containing episodes 17–24, was released on November 30, 2016, and the fourth, containing episodes 25–33, was released on March 29, 2017.

Anime

An anime television series adaptation was announced by Kadokawa in July 2015. The series is directed by Masaharu Watanabe and written by Masahiro Yokotani, with animation by the studio White Fox. Kyuta Sakai is serving as both character designer and as chief animation director. Music for the series is composed by Kenichiro Suehiro. Kentaro Minegishi is the series' director of photography, and Yoshito Takamine serves as art director. Jin Aketagawa handled sound direction for the anime, and sound effects were produced by Yuji Furuya. Other staff members include Hitomi Sudo (editing), Yu Karube (3D director), Saaya Kinjō (art configuration), Izumi Sakamoto (color design), and Noritaka Suzuki and Gōichi Iwabatake (prop design).

The 25-episode series premiered on April 4, 2016, with an extended 50-minute first episode. It was broadcast on TV Tokyo, TV Osaka, TV Aichi, and AT-X. The series was simulcast by Crunchyroll. Episode 14 and 18 ran 2 minutes longer than a typical anime episode, clocking at 25 minutes and 45 seconds. The final episode ran 3 minutes longer, clocking at 27 minutes and 15 seconds.

A series of anime shorts featuring chibi versions of the characters, titled , were produced by Studio Puyukai to accompany the series. The shorts ran for eleven episodes before being replaced by a new series of shorts, titled , which began airing on June 24, 2016, and ran for 14 episodes. The shorts are directed, written, and produced by Minoru Ashina, with character designs by Minoru Takehara, who also animated the series alongside Sumi Kimoto and Chisato Totsuka. Kenichiro Suehiro reprised his role as composer for the shorts, while Tomoji Furuya of Suwara Pro produced the sound effects. Jin Aketagawa directed the sound at production company Magic Capsule.

The shorts aired on AT-X after each episode of the regular series, starting on April 8, 2016. Crunchyroll acquired the streaming rights to both shorts. Animax Asia later aired the series starting on January 13, 2017.

An original video animation (OVA) episode was announced at the "MF Bunko J Summer School Festival 2017" event on September 10, 2017. All of the main staff and cast returned for the OVA, with Tatsuya Koyanagi joining as chief director. Titled Memory Snow, the OVA was screened in Japanese theaters starting on October 6, 2018. A second OVA, titled , was announced on September 23, 2018. The OVA is an adaptation of the prequel novel  which was included with the first Japanese Blu-ray release of the television series, and focused on the meeting of Emilia and Puck. It was released in Japanese theaters on November 8, 2019.

The series is licensed by Crunchyroll outside of Asia and by Muse Communication in Southeast Asia and South Asia. Funimation announced during their Katsucon 2018 panel that they will release it on home video with an English dub in North America as part of the two companies' partnership. Funimation released the first part of the first season on DVD and Blu-ray in North America on June 19, 2018;, and the second part on February 5, 2019. Funimation later released all of season 1 on one Blu-ray on June 9, 2020. In the United Kingdom,  the series is distributed by Anime Limited, who released the first part of the first season on DVD on June 25, 2018 and the second part on May 20, 2019. Anime Limited later released both parts on Blu-ray on August 19, 2019, with a complete collection being released on February 15, 2021. Both Funimation and Anime Limited's Season 1 Part 1 Blu-ray releases received negative attention after it was discovered that they showed visible color banding and compression artifacts. Madman Anime released the first part of the first season in Australia on Blu-ray on May 8, 2019.

On March 23, 2019, it was announced that a second season is in production. The cast and staff will reprise their roles for the second season. It was scheduled to premiere in April 2020, but was delayed to July 2020 due to production complications caused by the COVID-19 pandemic. Before the arrival of the second season's initial premier date, an edited version of the first season premiered on January 1, 2020, on AT-X and other channels, with the edited version recapping the first season through one-hour episodes. It also included new additional footage. The OVA "Memory Snow" was also broadcast in between the episodes 5 and 6 of the edited version.

The second season was announced to be in a split-cour format, with the first half airing from July 8 to September 30, 2020, and the second half airing from January 6 to March 24, 2021. The English dub for Season 2 Part 1 began airing from August 26 onwards. There is no standard length for each episode and the runtime is varying from 24 to 30 minutes.

A crossover comedy series, Isekai Quartet, Chibi style, much like the OVA. It also featured characters from the light novel series KonoSuba, Overlord, and The Saga of Tanya the Evil, all published by Kadokawa Corporation. The anime premiered on April 9, 2019.

Music
The first opening theme song was "Redo" by Konomi Suzuki, and the first ending theme was "Styx Helix" by Myth & Roid, while for episode 7 the ending theme was "Straight Bet," also by Myth & Roid. The second opening theme song, titled "Paradisus-Paradoxum," was performed by Myth & Roid, while the second ending theme, "Stay Alive," was performed by Rie Takahashi. Myth & Roid also performed the ending theme for episode 14 titled "theater D."

The second season's first opening theme song was "Realize" by Konomi Suzuki, while the second season's first ending theme song was "Memento" by Nonoc. The second season's second opening theme song was "Long Shot" by Mayu Maeshima (former vocalist of Myth & Roid), while the second season's second ending theme song was "Believe In You" by Nonoc.

The series' soundtrack was released on CD on October 26, 2016. The disk contains 21 tracks composed by Kenichiro Suehiro.

"Redo," Suzuki's 10th single, was released on CD on May 11, 2016. The single was also released as a limited edition with a DVD featuring a music video, a live concert video, and a "making of" video. The songs were performed by Suzuki, with lyrics by Genki Mizuno and arrangement by Makoto Miyazaki.

The CD for "Styx Helix," the series' first ending theme, was Myth & Roid's 3rd single. Written, arranged, and performed by the group, it was released on May 25, 2016, and included both regular and instrumental versions of "Styx Helix" and "STRAIGHT BET."

"Stay Alive," the second ending theme, was released as a single on August 24, 2016. The songs were performed by Takahashi (Emilia) and Minase (Rem). The songs were written and arranged by Heart's Cry.

Myth & Roid released the second opening theme as a single on August 24, 2016. The CD included regular and instrumental versions of "Paradisus-Paradoxum" and "theater D."

For Memory Snow, three pieces of theme music were used: the ending theme "Memory Memory Snow" and the image song "Relive" by Nonoc, and the insert song "Memories" by Riko Azuna.

Video games

In August 2016, game developer 5pb. announced that they were developing a visual novel based on the series, titled . The game follows an original story that differs from the light novel and the anime, and allows the player to choose between routes featuring Emilia, Rem, Ram, Felt, Beatrice, Crusch, Priscilla, or Anastasia. A DLC allows players who pre-ordered the game to replace the character's costumes with swimsuits. The opening theme, was performed by Suzuki, who sung the anime's first opening theme, while the ending theme, was performed by Minase and Murakawa. The game has received a generally positive score of 30/40 on Famitsu.

In Japan, the game was originally scheduled to be released for PlayStation 4 and PlayStation Vita on March 23, 2017, but was delayed to March 30, 2017, due to certain circumstances. The limited edition of the game came with a soundtrack CD and either a Ram (for the PS4 version) or Rem (for the PSVita version) SD figure.

A virtual reality app that allows the user to interact with the character Rem was released for iOS and Android on May 26, 2017. A version featuring the character Emilia was released on June 6, 2017. The game was later ported to both PC and to the PlayStation VR.

A role-playing mobile game called Re:Zero − Starting Life in Another World: Infinity that was made by Tianjin Tianxiang Interactive Technology and authorized by White Fox was released on January 14, 2020, in China. Another mobile game that made by Sega titled  was released for Android and iOS on September 9, 2020. In the game, the player can become protagonist Subaru Natsuki and relive the story of the anime. From there, the player can branch into “What If” stories. Furthermore, a new story original to the game was produced under the full supervision of original author Tappei Nagatsuki.

A tactical adventure video game was developed by Chime and published by Spike Chunsoft titled  and was released for PlayStation 4, PC, and Nintendo Switch in January 2021. The game has an original story and was produced under the full supervision of original author Tappei Nagatsuki and illustrated by the series' illustrator Shinichiou Otsuka. It is the first official Re:Zero game to have an English release.

A role-playing browser game called Re:Zero -Starting Life in Another World- Forbidden Book and the Mysterious Spirit that was made by DMM Games released on July 14, 2021, in Japan. On March 14, 2022, DMM Games has announced the game will be shut down on July 14, 2022.

Other media
Kadokawa published a 272-page guide to the series' first three arcs, titled Re:zeropedia, alongside the 10th volume of the novels on October 24, 2016. An official dōjinshi art book was published at Comiket, with art by Ponkan 8 (Shirobako and My Youth Romantic Comedy Is Wrong, As I Expected), Yuka Nakajima (Listen to Me, Girls. I Am Your Father!, Amagi Brilliant Park), and TakayaKi (Arifureta Shokugyou de Sekai Saikyou). A crossover with Natsume Akatsuki's light novel series KonoSuba, titled Re:Starting Life Blessing This World was published on December 21, 2016. The book featured interviews with each series' authors and illustrators, as well as the principal voice actors in their respective anime adaptations. A one-shot crossover manga by Daichi Matsuse and Masahito Watari (illustrator of the KonoSuba manga adaptation) was also included. A fanbook containing commentary on the episodes of the anime, as well as the collected Animate Times cast and staff interviews, was published on December 31, 2016. Bushiroad released a Booster Pack set and Trial Deck+ of Re:ZERO -Starting Life in Another World- for Weiß Schwarz on December 28, 2018.

Reception
According to Japanese light novel news website LN News, the series had 1 million copies in print as of June 2016, over 2 million as of September 2016 and over 3.1 million as of May 2017. As of November 2019, the sales count is approximately 4.6 million. The light novel series was the tenth best-selling light novel series in Japan between November 2015 and May 2016, selling 263,357 copies. During that period, the first and second volumes were the 35th and 48th best-selling light novel volumes, selling 49,194 and 41,617 copies, respectively. The series was the fourth best-selling series in 2016, selling 1,007,381 copies between November 2015 and November 2016. Its first three volumes were the 14th, 21st, and 30th best selling volumes of the year, selling 155,363, 127,970, and 110,574 copies, respectively. In 2017, the series was the third best-selling series, with 925,671 copies sold. Its 1st, 10th, 11th, and 12th volumes respectively ranking 19th (60,135 copies), 25th (56,001 copies), 7th (101,480 copies), and 12th (79,431 copies) in the period between November 2016 and May 2017.

The series was the 21st best selling anime series on home video during 2016, selling approximately 68,791 Blu-ray and DVD sets. The OVA "Memory Snow," released in 2018, sold a total of 10,429 Blu-ray and DVD copies.

Theron Martin of Anime News Network reviewed the first book, praising it for being a somewhat fresher take on the "transported to another world" concept, but leveled criticism at it for bumpy and awkwardly timed dialogue and a tendency for redundancy.

The series ranked first in a poll of 820 people conducted by the Japanese website Anime! Anime!, to determine the best show of spring 2016. Andy Hanley from UK Anime Network considered the anime adaptation as one of 2016's best series.

The Managing Editor from Anime Now!, Richard Eisenbeis lists the anime as one of his top picks from 2016 for its "culturally complex" world and characters that have "their own plans, faults, and motivations." He praised Subaru as the "most complex character of the year" due to provoking the audience to "cheer him and despise him" in a world that portrayed him as the "least special person in it."

The series took second place in the 2015–2016 Newtype Anime Awards. Additionally, director Masaharu Watanabe took first place, as did Subaru, Rem, and Puck (in the best male, female, and mascot character categories, respectively). Masahiro Yokotani's screenplay took second place, while the series' character designs (by Shin'ichirō Ōtsuka and Kyuta Sakai) took third place. The series' soundtrack and second opening theme both took fourth place in their categories. The light novels and the anime both took first place in their respective categories in the 2017 Sugoi Japan Awards.

In a survey of (primarily female) Otamart users, the series was ranked second on a list of the most successful anime/manga/light novel franchises of 2016. Re:Zero was nominated for "Anime of the Year" in Crunchyroll's 1st Anime Awards in 2016, and was also the service's most-watched series of 2016, topping Yuri on Ice.

See also

 Vivy: Fluorite Eye's Song

References

Notes

Citations

External links

  
  at Shōsetsuka ni Narō 
  
  at Big Gangan 
  at 5pb. 
 

 
2014 Japanese novels
2016 anime ONAs
2017 video games
2018 anime OVAs
Adventure anime and manga
Anime and manga based on light novels
Comics about time travel
Crunchyroll Anime Awards winners
Crunchyroll anime
Dark fantasy anime and manga
Funimation
Gangan Comics manga
Isekai anime and manga
Isekai novels and light novels
Japanese adventure novels
Japanese fantasy novels
Japanese time travel television series
Kadokawa Dwango franchises
Light novels first published online
Light novels
MF Bunko J
Mages (company)
Mass media franchises
Media Factory manga
Muse Communication
Mythopoeia
Novels about time travel
PlayStation 4 games
PlayStation Vita games
Seinen manga
Seven deadly sins in popular culture
Shōsetsuka ni Narō
Studio Puyukai
TV Tokyo original programming
Television shows based on light novels
Time loop anime and manga
Time loop novels
Video games based on novels
Visual novels
White Fox
Yen Press titles
Yōkai in anime and manga